Let It Be: Special Edition is an expanded reissue of the original 1970 album by the English rock band the Beatles. It was released by Apple Records on 15 October 2021 and includes a new stereo remix of the album, as well as a Dolby Atmos mix, by Giles Martin, the son of Beatles producer George Martin.

Background and content 
This was not the first time Let It Be was released as a box set. The original album came out in a limited edition box set in the UK on 8 May 1970, which went out of print by that December and was replaced in circulation with a standard issue LP. Aside from the LP, the original box set included a 164-page paperback book.

Like the previous Beatles 50th anniversary box sets, Let It Be: Special Edition was originally going to be released the same month as the original album. However, due to the COVID-19 pandemic, its release was delayed until October 2021 while the release of the Get Back documentary series was delayed until November 2021. Additionally, the release dates  of the super deluxe editions of John Lennon/Plastic Ono Band and All Things Must Pass were delayed until April 2021 and August 2021 respectively.

A trailer for Let It Be: Special Edition was released in August 2021, two months before its release. It was also revealed that a book containing essays, photos, session notes and a message from Paul McCartney on his thoughts on both the box set and the upcoming Get Back documentary will be included in the box set Let It Be: Special Edition features a remix of the original Let It Be album by producer Giles Martin and engineer Sam Okell, along with session highlights, outtakes, an EP featuring four additional unreleased tracks and new mixes and a remaster of Glyn Johns' original 1969 Get Back mix. Let It Be: Special Edition is available in both CD and vinyl formats.

The box set included the first official release of the 1969 Get Back mix, which was previously available in bootleg form. However, some sources state that due to a mixup, the true 1969 mix is available only on the Japan Super High Material (SHM) CD release, and that the mix on all other releases combines elements from both the 1969 mix and the 1970 mix of the Get Back album.

On 28 January 2022, the full audio recording of the rooftop concert was released to streaming services as The Beatles: Get Back — The Rooftop Performance.

Reception 
Let It Be: Special Edition received positive reviews. In an online review, music critic David Quantick stated the box set "does wonders for the record" and that it gives the listener "a bird’s-eye view of the sessions". Pitchfork gave it a 9.1 rating and said in their review that the box set shines a light on "the brilliant and tumultuous process" of the album, and called some of the outtakes "uncomfortable and fascinating".

On Metacritic, Let It Be: Special Edition holds an aggregate score of 91 out of 100, based on seven reviews, indicating "universal acclaim".

Track listings

New stereo mix of original album

Super Deluxe edition tracks

Personnel 
 Giles Martin – mixing supervisor
Sam Okell – mixing co-engineer

Charts

References 

2021 compilation albums
The Beatles compilation albums
Albums produced by George Martin
Reissue albums
Albums postponed due to the COVID-19 pandemic